Edward Wilson (c. 1719–1764) of Dallam Tower was member of the Parliament of Great Britain for Westmorland from 1747 to 1754, being returned unopposed, and was an unsuccessful candidate for the same seat in 1761. He succeeded his father Daniel Wilson (1680–1754) in the seat.

References

  

1719 births
1764 deaths
British MPs 1747–1754
Members of the Parliament of Great Britain for English constituencies
People from Westmorland